Legrand or Le Grand is a French surname. It may refer to:

 Arthur Legrand (1833–1916), French lawyer, public servant and politician
 Augustin Legrand, French actor
 Chip Le Grand, Australian sports journalist
 Claude Legrand (1762-1815), French general
 Clay LeGrand, American judge
 Connie LeGrand, American motorsports journalist
 Daniel Legrand (1783–1859), Swiss industrialist and philanthropist
 Edwin O. LeGrand (1801–1861), Texas Revolution figure
 Eric LeGrand (born 1990), American football player
 Fedde Le Grand (born 1977), Dutch DJ and producer
 François Legrand, pseudonym of Franz Antel, Austrian filmmaker
 François Legrand (climber) (born 1970), French rock climber
 Homer Eugene Le Grand (1944–2017), American-Australian historian of science
 Jacques Legrand (Mongolist) (born 1946), French linguist and anthropologist
 Jacques Legrand (philatelist) (1820–1912), French philatelist
 Jacques Legrand (resistance leader) (1906–1944), French Resistance leader
 Julie Le Grand, British actress
 London LeGrand (born 1966), American singer of the band Brides of Destruction
 Louis Legrand (artist) (1863–1951), French artist
 Louis Legrand (theologian) (1711–1780), French priest and theologian
 Marc-Antoine Legrand (1673–1728), French actor and playwright
 Michel Legrand (1932–2019), French composer, arranger, conductor and pianist
 Mirtha Legrand, Argentine actress and TV personality
 Paul Legrand (1816–1898), French mime
 Pierre Le Grand, 17th-century Caribbean buccaneer
 Richard LeGrand (1882–1963), American actor
 Silvia Legrand (1927–2020), Argentine actress, twin sister of Mirtha Legrand

French-language surnames